Saharanthus is a monotypic genus of flowering plants belonging to the family Plumbaginaceae. The only species is Saharanthus ifniensis.

Its native range is Western Sahara.

References

Plumbaginaceae
Monotypic Caryophyllales genera